Nathan Bird, known professionally as Birdz, is an Australian rapper, songwriter, and record producer. As of 2021, he has released one studio album and two extended plays. His second studio album, Legacy, was released on 19 November 2021.

A prominent activist, Birdz describes his music as a "declaration of survival".

Early life
Nathan Bird is a Butchulla man who grew up in Katherine, Northern Territory and describes himself as "a proud Murri man with Badtjala, Juru, Scottish and Melanesian heritage."

In 2019, Bird said "I remember staying up late on the weekends just so that I could catch Rage play the standard half an hour of rap videos, before their programming would return to whatever was popular on the Australian charts at the time. Seeing artists like Ice Cube speak out against police brutality and racism on "Fuck tha Police" is still one of the coolest things I've ever witnessed. It reminded me of my father and how his confidence would never break stride, no matter where he was or who he was with. Since that day, my passion for hip-hop has never wavered."

Career
Birdz released "Red Black and Yellow" in June 2013 which is inspired by experiences as a young Aboriginal man residing in Brisbane, Queensland. The song paints a vivid picture of the everyday challenges black Australia continues to endure. Birdz released his debut EP Birdz Eye View in September 2013.

In February 2015, Birdz told The Guardian "I'm a full-time rapper and part-time support worker for Link-Up Victoria, currently residing in Melbourne."

Birdz released his debut studio album Train of Thought in August 2017. At the Music Victoria Awards of 2017, the album was nominated for Best Hip Hop Album, while it won Best Independent Hip Hop Album at the AIR Awards of 2018.

On 1 October 2021, Birdz released "Legacy Part 2", a collaboration with Missy Higgins and announced his second album Legacy will be released in November 2021.

Discography

Studio albums

Extended plays

Singles

As lead artist

Awards and nominations

AIR Awards
The Australian Independent Record Awards (known colloquially as the AIR Awards) is an annual awards night to recognise, promote and celebrate the success of Australia's Independent Music sector.

! 
|-
! scope="row"| 2018
| Train of Thought
| Best Independent Hip Hop Album
| 
| 
|}

Music Victoria Awards
The Music Victoria Awards, are an annual awards night celebrating Victorian music. They commenced in 2005.

! 
|-
|rowspan="2"| 2017
| Birdz
| Best Aboriginal Act
| 
|rowspan="3"| 
|-
| Train of Thought| Best Hip Hop Album
| 
|-
|rowspan="1"| 2020
| Birdz
| Best Hip Hop Act
| 
|}

National Indigenous Music Awards
The National Indigenous Music Awards recognise excellence, innovation and leadership among Aboriginal and Torres Strait Islander musicians from throughout Australia. They commenced in 2004.

! 
|-
! scope="row" rowspan="2"| 2021
| Himself
| Artist of the Year
| 
| rowspan="2"| 
|-
| "Bagi-la-m Bargan"
| Song of the Year
| 
|-
! scope="row" rowspan="1"| 2022
| Legacy''
| Album of the Year
| 
| 
|-
|}

References

1990s births
Bad Apples Music artists
Australian male rappers
Living people
Year of birth uncertain